Terra Holdings, founded in 1995, is a parent company of several previously acquired real estate brokerage firms that focus on real estate in the New York City and Manhattan area. The company was established in 1995 and has since acquired Brown Harris Stevens, Feathered Nest, and Halstead Property. It also has a service arm known as the Vanderbilt Companies that focus on insurance, appraisals, advertising, and marketing. Co-chairmen and owners of Terra Holdings are David Burris, Kent Swig, Arthur Zeckendorf, and William Lie Zeckendorf. Their head office is at 770 Lexington Avenue. In June 2017, they purchased the cooperative and condominium management division (with 8,250 units in 35 buildings in New York) from Rose Associates.

References

External links
About Terra Holdings, Brown Harris Stevens

Privately held companies based in New York City
American real estate brokers
Real estate companies established in 1995
American companies established in 1995
1995 establishments in New York (state)
Real estate companies of the United States